Malawi Armed Forces College FC (MAFCO) is a Malawian football (soccer) club based in Salima, Central Region and currently playing in the TNM Super League, the top division of Malawian football.

History
MAFCO, return to top league in 2010 winning the Central Region Football League after four years in the second division.

After three season finished at the bottom of the league table, struggling with relegation, the soldiers, under the management of head coach Stereo Gondwe, clinched 3rd position in 2013 season and won the President Cup after beating Silver Strikers FC on the final. 

In the following year, the team finished in 7th position and reached the quarter-finals of  the Malawi Carlsberg Cup and semi-finals in the Standard Bank Knockout Cup.

In the 2015 season MAFCO finished as Super League runners-up, their highest league placing and reached again the quarter-final of the Malawi Carlsberg Cup.

In 2018, The Salima based soldiers, ended the nine-year stay in the TNM Super League after finished in 15th position.

Stadium
Currently the team plays at the 1,000 capacity Chitowe Stadium in Nkhotakota.

Honours
Super League of Malawi: 
 Runners-up (1): 2015

Central Region Football League
 Winners (1): 2009–10

President Cup
 Winners (1): 2013–14
Central Region Football League
 Winners (1): 2019

References

External links
Tag archives - Nyasatimes.com
Club profile - Soccerway.com

Football clubs in Malawi
Military association football clubs in Malawi
University and college association football clubs